Santiago Roman Espinal (born November 13, 1994) is a Dominican professional baseball infielder for the Toronto Blue Jays of Major League Baseball (MLB). He was drafted by the Boston Red Sox in the 10th round of the 2016 Major League Baseball draft.

High school
Espinal was born and grew up in the Dominican Republic until age 13, when he moved to the US. He attended Lyman High School in Longwood, Florida for four years. He then moved to New York and graduated through Penn Foster High School. Espinal attended Seminole State College of Florida, and then attended Miami Dade College on a scholarship and played college baseball for them in 2016.

Professional career

Boston Red Sox
Espinal was drafted by the Boston Red Sox in the 10th round, 298th overall, of the 2016 MLB draft.

Espinal played for the Rookie-level Gulf Coast League Red Sox in 2016, hitting .244/.330/.267 with 10 runs batted in (RBI). He played for the Class-A Greenville Drive in 2017, hitting .280/.334/.358 with four home runs and 46 RBI. Espinal began the 2018 season with the Advanced-A Salem Red Sox.

Toronto Blue Jays
On June 28, 2018, Espinal was traded to the Toronto Blue Jays in exchange for Steve Pearce and cash considerations. Espinal split the remainder 2018 between the Advanced-A Dunedin Blue Jays and the Double-A New Hampshire Fisher Cats, hitting .297/.356/.444 with 10 home runs and 60 RBI between the two teams and Salem. He played for the Surprise Saguaros of the Arizona Fall League (AFL) following the 2018 season.

Espinal split the 2019 season between New Hampshire and the Triple-A Buffalo Bisons, hitting a combined .287/.347/.393 with seven home runs and 71 RBI. Espinal was added to the Blue Jays 40-man roster after the 2019 season. On July 23, 2020, he was added to the Blue Jays active roster to begin the 2020 season, which had been delayed due to the COVID-19 pandemic. On July 25, 2020, Espinal made his MLB debut. Three days later, on July 28, Espinal got his first hit in the Major Leagues against the Washington Nationals. Overall with the 2020 Blue Jays, Espinal batted .267 with no home runs and 6 RBIs in 26 games.

On July 3, 2021, Espinal hit his first career major league home run, a two-run shot off Tampa Bay Rays reliever Matt Wisler at Sahlen Field in Buffalo.

Overall in 2021, Espinal batted .311/.376/.405 with 2 home runs, 17 RBIs and 6 stolen bases in 92 games. He led all qualifying AL third basemen with 16 total zone runs and a 3.13 range factor.

Espinal began the 2022 season expected to platoon at second base with Cavan Biggio but by mid-May was receiving acclaim for his impressive offensive numbers and game-changing defence while Biggio was optioned to the Triple A Buffalo Bisons after going 1-for-23 in 13 games with Toronto. Blue Jays' General Manager 
Ross Atkins declared Espinal "an everyday player" after he was one of only five Blue Jays' players to appear in all of Toronto's first 17 games. Espinal was selected for the 2022 All-Star Game as a replacement for José Altuve.

On January 13, 2023, Espinal signed a one-year, $2.1 million contract with the Blue Jays, avoiding salary arbitration.

References

External links

Miami Dade Sharks bio

1995 births
Living people
American League All-Stars
Buffalo Bisons (minor league) players
Dominican Republic expatriate baseball players in the United States
Dunedin Blue Jays players
Estrellas Orientales players
Greenville Drive players
Gulf Coast Red Sox players
Major League Baseball players from the Dominican Republic
Major League Baseball infielders
New Hampshire Fisher Cats players
People from Santiago de los Caballeros
Salem Red Sox players
Surprise Saguaros players
Toronto Blue Jays players